Caesar Must Die is a 2012 Italian drama film directed by Paolo and Vittorio Taviani. The film competed at the 62nd Berlin International Film Festival where it won the Golden Bear. The film is set in Rebibbia Prison (suburb of Rome), and follows convicts in their rehearsals ahead of a prison performance of Julius Caesar.

Cast
 Salvatore Striano as Bruto (Brutus)
 Cosimo Rega as Cassio (Cassius)
 Giovanni Arcuri as Cesare (Caesar)
 Antonio Frasca as Marcantonio (Mark Antony)
 Juan Dario Bonetti as Decio (Decius Brutus)
 Vincenzo Gallo as Lucio (Lucius)
 Rosario Majorana as Metello (Metellus Cimber)
 Francesco De Masi as Trebonio (Trebonius)
 Gennaro Solito as Cinna (Cinna)
 Vittorio Parrella as Casca (Casca)
 Pasquale Crapetti as Legionär
 Francesco Carusone as Wahrsager (Soothsayer)
 Fabio Rizzuto as Stratone (Strato)
 Maurilio Giaffreda as Ottavio (Octavius)
 Fabio Cavalli as Theatre director

Accolades
Caesar Must Die won the Golden Bear at the 62nd Berlin International Film Festival in February 2012 where British director Mike Leigh led the judging panel. The Hollywood Reporter described the outcome as "a major upset". Der Spiegel said it was a "very conservative selection". Der Tagesspiegel criticised the outcome, saying that the "jury shunned almost all the contemporary films that were admired or hotly debated at an otherwise pretty remarkable festival". The film was also selected as the Italian entry for the Best Foreign Language Oscar at the 85th Academy Awards, but it did not make the final shortlist.

Critics praised the use of actual prisoners in the film, saying it brought a higher intensity to the piece. Filmed largely in black-and-white, it has been described as a "deeply humanist film" that "blends gentle humour with an emotional punch". Paolo Taviani said that he hoped moviegoers would "say to themselves or even those around them... that even a prisoner with a dreadful sentence, even a life sentence, is and remains a human being". Vittorio Taviani read out the names of the cast.

At Metacritic, the film was given a rating of 76/100 based on 12 critics, which evaluates as generally favorable reviews

See also

 List of black-and-white films produced since 1970
 List of submissions to the 85th Academy Awards for Best Foreign Language Film
 List of Italian submissions for the Academy Award for Best Foreign Language Film

References

External links
 
 
 

2012 films
2012 drama films
Italian drama films
Italian prison films
Films about theatre
Films set in Rome
Films shot in Rome
Films based on Julius Caesar (play)
Films directed by Paolo and Vittorio Taviani
Golden Bear winners
Italian black-and-white films
2010s Italian-language films